Flexible glass is an alleged lost invention from the time of the reign of Tiberius Caesar. It may also refer to a form used today in fiber optic cables, though it is unknown if they are the same material.

History and mythology 
Supposedly, the inventor of flexible glass (vitrum flexile) brought a drinking bowl made of the material before Tiberius Caesar. The bowl was put through a test to break it, but it merely dented, rather than shattering. The inventor repaired the bowl very easily with a small hammer, which he pulled from a pocket in his toga, according to Petronius. After the inventor swore that he was the only man alive who knew the manufacturing technique, Tiberius had the man beheaded. He feared that the glass would devalue gold and silver, since the material might be more valuable.

The account is most popularly related by two compilers, Pliny the Elder (Naturalis Historia XXXVI.lxvi.195) and Petronius (Satyricon 51). Pliny claims that the story of flexible glass is "More widely spread than well authenticated." Petronius's work is more dramatized and satirical. Pliny and Petronius's story is retold by Isidore of Seville (Etymologiae XVI.16.6, ‘De vitro’), which in turn is included in pseudo-Heraclius's 13th century collection of technical recipes.

Modern usage 

In the modern era, flexible glass is used in fiber optic cables and cannot be smashed with a hammer. It is extremely pure glass, manufactured with few defects and a pristine surface. In 2012, Corning Inc. introduced Willow Glass, a flexible glass based on borosilicate glass. In 2016, Schott AG introduced a similar flexible glass product.

References 

Glass engineering and science
History of glass
Glass types
Greek inventions
Lost inventions